Masters of Dragonlance Art is a 2002 book edited by Mark Sehestedt.

Contents
Masters of Dragonlance Art is a book in which full color art from various Dragonlance publications is presented.

Reception

Reviews
Chronicle
Review by Karen Haber (2003) in Locus, #505 February 2003

References

Books about role-playing games
Dragonlance